Vũ Hoàng Điệp (born November 22, 1987, in Hanoi) is a Vietnamese beauty pageant titleholder.  She is the first Vietnamese to win a major beauty contest, the 2009 Miss International Beauty, in Chengdu, China on August 1, 2009.

References

Living people
1987 births
Vietnamese beauty pageant winners